The 2011–12 Memphis Tigers men's basketball team represented the University of Memphis in the 2011–12 college basketball season, the 91st season of Tiger basketball. The Tigers were coached by head coach Josh Pastner.  Pastner was assisted by Jack Murphy and Damon Stoudamire.  From the summer of 2011 until December 2011, NBA player Luke Walton was also an assistant coach, though he departed from the position with the end of the NBA lockout.  Jimmy Williams was brought in to replace Walton for the remainder of the 2011–12 season. The Tigers played their home games at the FedExForum in Memphis, Tennessee and were members of Conference USA.

Pre-season
The 2010–11 Memphis Tigers finished the season with a record of 25–10 (10–6 C-USA). The Tigers finished in fourth place in C-USA, but won the 2011 Conference USA men's basketball tournament to secure a berth in the 2011 NCAA Division I men's basketball tournament where they lost in the second round to Arizona.

Departures

Statistics accurate as of June 3, 2011.

Recruiting

Transfers

Season summary 
The Tigers began the season ranked in the top 15 of the AP and Coaches polls and the consensus pre-season favorite to win the Conference USA championship.  The Tigers had scheduled aggressively, with their out of conference schedule ranking as one of the toughest in the country among division 1 teams.

The Tigers, with a roster dominated by a large sophomore class and freshman blue chip recruit Adonis Thomas, struggled somewhat with their difficult out of conference schedule.  Despite not taking any bad losses prior to the start of conference play, the Tigers did not defeat a ranked opponent during their non-conference slate.  Sophomore Will Barton, however, quickly became a favorite to win CUSA player of the year honors, ranking in the top 50 in both rebounds per game and points per game in division 1 for the 2011–12 season.

On January 16, 2012, the Commercial Appeal reported that talented freshman Adonis Thomas would miss the remainder of the regular season due to ankle surgery.  Senior guard and starter Charles Carmouche would also miss all but the first few games of the Tigers' season with knee problems.  Thomas, however, returned to the court for the Tigers' first CUSA tournament game.

With a victory at Tulsa on March 3, the Tigers clinched the CUSA regular season championship.  The Tigers finished the regular season with an overall record of 23 wins and 8 losses, and a conference record of 13 wins and 3 losses. On March 7, 2012, Will Barton was named Conference USA Player of the Year.

In the CUSA tournament, the Tigers defeated their three opponents by an average of 25 points and ultimately won the championship over Marshall on March 10 in Memphis. For the second consecutive year, Tigers' point guard Joe Jackson was named the tournament's most valuable player. Will Barton and Tarik Black were also named to the all-tournament team.

The Tigers received an 8 seed in the West Region of the 2012 NCAA tournament, a seed which was widely considered to be too low given the Tigers' resume.  Memphis lost to 9 seed St. Louis in the second round on March 16, ending their season.

Roster

Schedule

|-
!colspan=9| Exhibition

|-
!colspan=9| Regular Season

|-
!colspan=9|  2012 Conference USA tournament
   
|-
   
|-
   
|-
!colspan=9| 2012 NCAA tournament

|-

Source:

Rankings

Notes

Memphis
Memphis Tigers men's basketball seasons
Memphis
Memphis
Memphis